George of the Jungle 2 is a 2003 comedy film and the sequel to the 1997 Disney film George of the Jungle. It was directed by David Grossman and written by Jordan Moffet. The film stars Thomas Haden Church, Julie Benz, Christina Pickles, Angus T. Jones, Michael Clarke Duncan, John Cleese, and Christopher Showerman. 

Cleese and Church reprise their roles from the first film, while Brendan Fraser is replaced by Showerman for the role of George. George is also a secondary character in the film, with Church playing the lead role. The film focuses on George trying to save Ape Mountain from his evil nemesis Lyle.

Plot
Six years after socialite Ursula Stanhope left civilization to marry George of the Jungle, George finds himself hard-pressed to fulfill the roles of jungle king, father, and husband. George's stress level increases when the "Mean Lion" challenges him for leadership of the jungle, and when Ursula's mother Beatrice teams up with Ursula's ex-fiancé, Lyle van de Groot, in a plot to forcibly take away all that George holds most dear. To do this, Beatrice invites Ursula, George, and George Junior to visit Las Vegas, which they accept. Throughout the visit, Beatrice and some of Ursula's fellow socialites try constantly to convince Ursula that George is unworthy of her affection. George, observing the threats but not his wife's resistance, begins to think himself unworthy of Ursula.

During the same time, George's mentor Ape has become a gambler and is in debt to several creditors, including Lyle. Upon discovering that Ape does not possess the exploitation rights of Ape Mountain, but George does, Lyle instead makes Ape work off his debts from the gambling for the next 17 years. He then engages Ape as a staged song performer and steals the deed to Ape Mountain from George's wardrobe. He thereafter sends two agents, Sally and Kowalski, to Ape Mountain, where they begin to demolish the jungle. The animals, terrified, turn to the Lion for guardianship.

Having failed to convince Ursula to divorce George, Beatrice hires Armando, a master of hypnosis to hypnotize Ursula into having no memory of having known George. The hypnotist brainwashes Ursula, giving her the idea that she had married Lyle. George, upon hearing from Beatrice that Ursula has left him, leaves his luck-charm with Ursula as she sleeps, then departs. He rescues Ape and leaves Las Vegas. Their departure triggers much commotion when the police force and the Animal Control Agency join forces to recapture them.

In San Francisco, Lyle fails to persuade Ursula that he is worthy of her affection. Ursula's memory, meanwhile, is stimulated by events similar to those in which George had played a major part. Later, George then tries to reconnect with Ursula and George Junior before leaving to rescue the jungle, remembering to use a bigger crate as a tip from Brendan Fraser, who was cramped during the first film. George gains Ursula's interest, but has trouble convincing her that he is her husband. Knocking her unconscious, George continues his journey back home with her, Ape, George Junior, and Rocky the kangaroo. In the jungle, George overthrows the Mean Lion and tries to convince the other animals to join him in stopping the diggers, but fails in gaining their lost trust in him until the diggers become an immediate threat. George defeats the bulldozers with the help of George Junior, Ape, Shep, Rocky, and Tookie Bird.

Lyle's agents Sally and Kowalski come to destroy the tree house, only to be defeated by George and Rocky. George is unable to defeat the digging machine until his son joins the fray. Lyle and Beatrice arrive to pick up Ursula and George Junior. George manages to defeat both of them by hanging Lyle in a tree and Beatrice is kissed by Ape. A defeated Lyle is pulled out of the jungle by the narrator, returns to San Francisco, and is arrested, plotting his revenge on George, Ursula, and their friends for defeating him, Sally, and Kowalski. After that, George kisses Ursula, restoring her full memory of him. After reviving Ursula's friends in a similar fashion (for they had been hypnotized into forgetting George also) they subsequently renew their wedding vows and learn to find balance among George's duties.

Cast
Thomas Haden Church as Lyle Van de Groot, George's nemesis and Ursula's ex-fiance. 
Christopher Showerman as George, King of the Jungle. Showerman replaces Brendan Fraser, with characters referencing this throughout the film.
Julie Benz as Ursula Stanhope, Queen of the Jungle. Benz replaces Leslie Mann.
Christina Pickles as Beatrice Stanhope, Ursula's mother, George's mother-in-law, and George Jr's maternal grandmother. Pickles replaces Holland Taylor.
Angus T. Jones as George Jr., Prince of the Jungle.
Kelly Miracco as Betsy, Ursula's best friend
Marjean Holden as Sally, one of Lyle's henchwomen
Erika Heynatz as Kowalski, another one of Lyle's henchwomen
Dean Vegas as Elvis Impersonator
John Kassir as Armando, The famous hypnotist and master of the hypnosis

Voices 
John Cleese as Ape
Michael Clarke Duncan as Mean lion
John Kassir as Rocky the kangaroo
Kevin Greutert as Tookie the toucan
Kevin Michael Richardson as Grouchy ape and chimpanzee
Tress MacNeille as Shep the Elephant and tiger
Dee Bradley Baker as Dexter the monkey and water buffalo
Keith Scott as Narrator

Release
Disney released George of the Jungle 2 direct-to-video on October 21, 2003. It later aired on Disney Channel. It also aired on Disney XD.  It was originally scheduled to be released on Summer 2003, but it was delayed to October 21, 2003. A week prior to release, Caterpillar Inc. sued Disney over concerns that the film's use of its trademark (appearing on the bulldozers) constituted damage to its reputation.  Caterpillar Inc. asked for a restraining order to prevent the release, but they were unsuccessful.

Reception
George of the Jungle 2 received generally negative reviews. On Rotten Tomatoes, the film has an approval rating of 17% based on reviews from 6 critics.

Joe Leydon of Variety wrote "One of the finest and funniest made-for-video sequels ever released on the Disney label offers an unusually satisfying mix of kid-friendly broad comedy and knowing pop culture parody."  Michael Rankins of DVD Verdict wrote that the film "delivers cheap, fluffy, mostly painfree chuckles" and suggested that people watch Jay Ward's cartoons instead.  Aaron Beierle of DVD Talk rated the film 2 out of 5 and wrote, "Although not quite the dreadful affair that most will be expecting from this kind of a direct-to-video effort, there's simply not much story for the film to go on and the only witty moments are provided by the narrator".

References

External links

2003 comedy films
2003 direct-to-video films
2003 films
American comedy films
Direct-to-video sequel films
Disney direct-to-video films
Films based on television series
Films set in Africa
Films shot in Queensland
George of the Jungle
Live-action films based on animated series
Live-action films based on Jay Ward cartoons
Films about animals
Films about apes
Films about elephants
Films about kangaroos and wallabies
Films about lions
Films about tigers
Films about hypnosis
Films scored by J. A. C. Redford
Films set in Nevada
2000s English-language films
2000s American films